Ulta Palta may refer to:

 Ulta Palta (1997 film), an Indian Kannada film
 Ulta Palta (1998 film), a Telugu comedy film